{{DISPLAYTITLE:5,6-Dichloro-1-beta-D-ribofuranosylbenzimidazole}}

5,6-Dichloro-1-β--ribofuranosylbenzimidazole (DRB) is a chemical compound that inhibits transcription elongation by RNA Polymerase II.  Sensitivity to DRB is dependent on DRB sensitivity inducing factor (DSIF), negative elongation factor (NELF), and positive transcription elongation factor b (P-TEFb).  DRB is a nucleoside analog and also inhibits some protein kinases.

References 

Nucleosides
Benzimidazoles
Organochlorides
Ribosides